The Budapest Open Access Initiative (BOAI) is a public statement of principles relating to open access to the research literature, which was released to the public on February 14, 2002. It arose from a conference convened in Budapest by the Open Society Institute on December 1–2, 2001 to promote open access which at that time was also known as Free Online Scholarship. This small gathering of individuals has been recognised as one of the major defining events of the open access movement. As of 2021, the text of the initiative had been translated to 13 languages.

On the 10th anniversary of the initiative in 2012, the ends and means of the original initiative were reaffirmed and supplemented with a set of concrete recommendations for achieving open access in the next 10 years.

Content

Initiative
The opening sentence of the Budapest Open Access Initiative encapsulates what the open access movement is all about, and what its potential is:

Definition
The document contains one of the most widely used definitions of open access, which has subsequently been reaffirmed as the definition of open access, 10 years after it was first published:

Strategy and funding 
As of 2001, the BOAI has recommended two complementary strategies in order to achieve open access to scientific literature. First, scholars should follow the practice of self-archiving which is when authors deposit a copy of their own text to open archives on the internet. Preferably these archives should conform to the standards of the Open Archives Initiative and make it easy for users to find the texts. Second, scholars should launch new online open access journals and help other periodicals to adapt the principles of open access.

The initiative was sponsored with a US$3 million grant from the Open Society Institute.

Signatories

The 16 original signatories of the Budapest Open Access Initiative included some of the world's early leaders in the open access movement: 
 Leslie Chan of Bioline International
 Darius Cuplinskas, Melissa Hagemann, Rima Kupryte of Open Society Institute
 István Rév, Open Society Institute, Open Society Archives
 Michael Eisen of the Public Library of Science
 Fred Friend († April 23, 2014) of University College London
 Yana Genova of Next Page Foundation
 Jean-Claude Guédon of the Université de Montréal
 Stevan Harnad of the University of Southampton/Université du Québec à Montréal
 Rick Johnson of the Scholarly Publishing and Academic Resources Coalition (SPARC)
 Manfredi La Manna of the Electronic Society for Social Scientists
 Monika Segbert, Electronic Information for Libraries (EIFL) Project consultant
 Sidnei de Souza, Informatics Director at CRIA, Bioline International
 Peter Suber, Professor of Philosophy, Earlham College and The Free Online Scholarship Newsletter
 Jan Velterop of BioMed Central

In February 2002, the signatories released BOAI in a version that could be signed by the public. , more than 5,932 individuals and 837 organizations had signed it.

10th anniversary
 In 2012 on the 10th anniversary of the original initiative, a new statement was released which reaffirmed the BOAI's definition of open access, its goals, strategies and commitment to make progress. It also contained "the new goal that within the next ten years, OA will become the default method for distributing new peer-reviewed research in every field and country", policy recommendations for universities, research funding agencies, recommendations on choosing the optimal licence (CC-BY), designing open access repository infrastructure, and advocacy for achieving open access.

See also 
 Berlin Declaration on Open Access to Knowledge in the Sciences and Humanities
 Bethesda Statement on Open Access Publishing
 Cape Town Open Education Declaration
 Open Access Week

References

External links 

 Budapest Open Access Initiative FAQ 
 Open Access News  by Peter Suber
 Openarchives.eu – The European Guide to OAI-PMH Digital Repositories in the World

Open access statements
Access to Knowledge movement
2001 documents